Voloiac is a commune located in Mehedinți County, Oltenia, Romania. It is composed of eight villages: Cotoroaia, Lac, Ruptura, Sperlești, Țițirigi, Valea Bună, Voloiac and Voloicel.

References

Communes in Mehedinți County
Localities in Oltenia